Xianju County ( Tai-chow dialect: Sin-kü Yön) is a county of Zhejiang, China. It is under the administration of the Taizhou city. It is the location of Shenxianju, a geological site protected by the Chinese government. Xianju is an economically underdeveloped county, relying somewhat on tourism. On October 15, Shenxianju scenic spot became a national 5A level scenic spot.

Administrative divisions
Subdistricts:
Fuying Subdistrict (福应街道), Nanfeng Subdistrict (南峰街道), Anzhou Subdistrict (安洲街道)

Towns:
Hengxi (横溪镇), Baita (白塔镇), Tianshi (田市镇), Guanlu (官路镇), Xiage (下各镇), Zhuxi (朱溪镇), Butou (埠头镇)

Townships:
Anling Township (安岭乡), Xigang Township (溪港乡), Qiushan Township (湫山乡), Potan Township (皤滩乡), Tanzhu Township (淡竹乡), Bulu Township (步路乡), Shangzhang Township (上张乡), Guangdu Township (广度乡), Dazhan Township (大战乡), Shuangmiao Township (双庙乡)

Climate

Tourist attractions
Xianju National Park is a national park and famous scenic spot in the county.

Transportation
Xianju is intersected by Zhuyong Expressway (S26; Zhuji – Yongjia) and Taijin Expressway (S28; Taizhou – Jinhua). Xianju South railway station is on the Jinhua–Taizhou railway. It is accessible by bus from all major cities in Zhejiang province.

References

County-level divisions of Zhejiang
Taizhou, Zhejiang